Pallisa District is a district in Eastern Uganda. Like most other Ugandan districts, it is named after its chief town, Pallisa, where the district headquarters are located.

Location
Pallisa District is bordered to the north by (from west to east): Serere District, Ngora District, Kumi District and Bukedea District. Mbale District lies to the east. Budaka District lies to the southeast, Kibuku District to the southwest and Kaliro District to the west. The coordinates of the district are: 01 01N, 33 43E.

Population
During the 1991 national population census, the district population was put at about 166,100. The 2002 national census estimated the population of the district at 255,900. In 2012, the population of Pallisa District was estimated at about 362,600.

Economic activities
Subsistence crop agriculture and animal husbandry are the two major economic activities in the district. To a lesser extent, fishing, fish farming and bee keeping are increasingly practiced in Pallisa District. The major crops include:

Cattle, goats, sheep, poultry, pigs, are some of the animals raised in the district. The district is further blessed with nine minor lakes that comprise part of the Lake Kyoga system. The following are the nine lakes:

There are  nine stocked fish farms in the district. Fish farming offers a big potential to increase the supply of fish for the population and hence improve on the nutrition of the population. Fish species include:

Sub Counties in Pallisa District
Pallisa District has 14 sub counties

.

See also

References

External links
Pallisa, Uganda

 
Districts of Uganda
Eastern Region, Uganda